Tibor Márkus is a Hungarian football player. He plays for Szigetszentmiklósi TK. He also played for Rovaniemen Palloseura and Apollon Limassol.

External links
imscouting.com

1978 births
Living people
Footballers from Budapest
Hungarian footballers
Association football forwards
Ferencvárosi TC footballers
BFC Siófok players
Nyíregyháza Spartacus FC players
III. Kerületi TUE footballers
Csepel SC footballers
FC Fót footballers
Százhalombattai LK footballers
Rovaniemen Palloseura players
FC Tatabánya players
Apollon Limassol FC players
Digenis Akritas Morphou FC players
Paksi FC players
Szigetszentmiklósi TK footballers
Cypriot First Division players
Hungarian expatriate footballers
Expatriate footballers in Finland
Expatriate footballers in Cyprus
Hungarian expatriate sportspeople in Finland
Hungarian expatriate sportspeople in Cyprus
Budaörsi SC managers